The National Association of Uruguayan Broadcasters (ANDEBU) is a trade association and lobby group representing the interests of for-profit radio and television broadcasters in Uruguay.

Established on 20 July 1933, ANDEBU represents around 90 terrestrial radio and television stations, as well as broadcast networks. A member of the International Association of Broadcasting, this association is very influential.

Members of ANDEBU
 CX 4 Radio Rural 
 CX 8 Radio Sarandí
 CX 14 El Espectador 
 CX 16 Radio Carve 
 CX 18 Radio Sarandí Sport 
 CX 22 Radio Universal 
 CX 24 Nuevo Tiempo 
 CX 28 Radio Imparcial 
 CX 36 Radio Centenario 
 CX 40 Radio Fénix 
 CX 42 Emisora Ciudad de Montevideo 
 CX 46 Radio América 
 CX 58 Radio Clarín

References

External links
 ANDEBU

Organizations based in Uruguay
1933 establishments in Uruguay
Organizations established in 1933
Broadcasting associations